Dufton is a civil parish in the Eden District, Cumbria, England.  It contains eleven listed buildings that are recorded in the National Heritage List for England.  All the listed buildings are designated at Grade II, the lowest of the three grades, which is applied to "buildings of national importance and special interest".  The parish contains the village of Dufton and the surrounding countryside.  Most of the listed buildings are houses and associated structures, farmhouses and farm buildings in the village centre.  Also in the village is a listed pump.  Away from the centre of the village, and listed, are a church, its rectory and structures in the rectory garden.


Buildings

References

Citations

Sources

Lists of listed buildings in Cumbria